Ginger Banks is an American webcam model, pornographic actress and sex worker advocate.

Career
Banks started webcamming in 2010 at the age of 19 while studying chemical engineering. Initially, Banks was ashamed to disclose her career and lied about her job; this contributed to her suffering from depression. She eventually quit school not wanting to deal with the reactions of her peers after she became popular. She became an advocate who speaks out about the damaging and discriminatory treatment that sex workers in the industry regularly face.

In 2018, Banks alleged that John Stagliano, the owner of Evil Angel, had groped her without their consent while directing a scene. In June 2020, Banks filed a police report against Stagliano over the alleged groping.

Banks was one of the targets of a harassment campaign against pornography performers by an Instagram user. Instagram had disabled her account in November 2018, and the user took credit for her deactivation through reporting her and others for violating its community guidelines. Her account was reactivated months later, and Banks admitted censoring her postings due to her wariness at being deactivated again. She believes that removing sex workers from social media marginalizes them by removing their marketing channels.

Advocacy
In June 2017, Banks posted a video on YouTube that compiled allegations of sexual assault against Ron Jeremy by members of the adult industry. While the allegations against Jeremy have stemmed back decades, it wasn't until the video and when the Harvey Weinstein sexual abuse allegations came to light that the accusations began to get noticed outside the industry. Banks was motivated to take a stand against Jeremy after speaking with dozens of women who alleged he had assaulted them at conventions and learning that others had known about and normalized these incidents with a, "Yeah, that's Ron." Jeremy argued that Banks' video compiled allegations that distorted the interactions with the women who had “buyer's remorse.” Jeremy was banned from several industry shows after Banks' social media campaign and the Free Speech Coalition, an industry trade group, rescinded its Positive Image Award that it had originally presented to him in 2009.

Banks made a video in 2018 hoping to appeal to Bernie Sanders after he had voted in support of the Stop Enabling Sex Traffickers Act and Fight Online Sex Trafficking Act (SESTA/FOSTA). She wanted him to think about the dangers that SESTA/FOSTA  would create for the sex work industry and asked him to consider fighting for the rights of sex workers.

Banks started a petition demanding Mindgeek to remove Porn Fidelity videos from its tube platforms after accusations of sexual misconduct surfaced against producer Ryan Madison by several performers. The Porn Fidelity and Teen Fidelity channels were removed from Pornhub, but the videos were still findable on the Mindgeek sites.

Banks and other sex workers spoke out against the intentions of TraffickingHub's campaign to shut Pornhub down. The campaign had accused Pornhub of exploiting and profiting from sex-trafficking and other non-consensual content exploiting women and children.  TraffickingHub's parent organization, Exodus Cry, opposes the decriminalization or legalization of sex work and seeks to abolish porn. Sex work advocates accuse the group of peddling a narrative of sex workers as victims. Banks started a petition for Pornhub to improve its verification process so that content can't be uploaded without the creator's consent.

Personal life
Banks has a sister, Emma Banks.

References

External links 

 

Year of birth missing (living people)
Living people
American pornographic film actresses
Place of birth missing (living people)
Webcam models
Sex worker activists in the United States
21st-century American women